Disporum uniflorum, commonly known as yellow fairy bells, is a species of perennial herb in the genus Disporum. It is native to Korea.

References

uniflorum
Flora of Korea